Fai della Paganella (Fai in local dialect) is a comune (municipality) in Trentino in the northern Italian region Trentino-Alto Adige/Südtirol, located about  northwest of Trento. In its territory is located the Paganella mountain and ski resort.

Fai della Paganella borders the following municipalities: Spormaggiore, Mezzolombardo, Cavedago, Zambana, Andalo and Terlago.

References

Cities and towns in Trentino-Alto Adige/Südtirol